John Lake (born c. 1917) was a Canadian football player who played for the Winnipeg Blue Bombers. He won the Grey Cup with them in 1939 and 1941.

References

Canadian football running backs
Winnipeg Blue Bombers players
Possibly living people
1910s births
Year of birth uncertain